Hestia (minor planet designation: 46 Hestia) is a large, dark main-belt asteroid. It is also the primary body of the Hestia clump, a group of asteroids with similar orbits.

Hestia was discovered by N. R. Pogson on August 16, 1857, at the Radcliffe Observatory, Oxford. Pogson awarded the honour of naming it to William Henry Smyth, the previous owner of the telescope used for the discovery. Smyth chose to name it after Hestia, Greek goddess of the hearth. This created a problem in Greek, where 4 Vesta also goes by the name Hestia.

The computed Lyapunov time for this asteroid is 30,000 years, indicating that it occupies a chaotic orbit that will change randomly over time because of gravitational perturbations of the planets.

Hestia has been studied by radar. 13-cm radar observations of this asteroid from the Arecibo Observatory between 1980 and 1985 were used to produce a diameter estimate of 131 km. In 1988 a search for satellites or dust orbiting this asteroid was performed using the UH88 telescope at the Mauna Kea Observatories, but the effort came up empty.

Properties
Photometric observations made in 2012 at the Organ Mesa Observatory in Las Cruces, New Mexico produced a light curve with a period of 21.040 ± 0.001 hours. There are two brightness minima, having luminosity variations of 0.05 and 0.12 in magnitude, respectively.

In 2000, Michalak estimated Hestia to have a mass of 3.5 kg.

Even though Hestia is only about 124 km in diameter, in 1997, Bange and Bec-Borsenberger estimated Hestia as having a mass of 2.1 kg, based on a perturbation by 19 Fortuna.  This older 1997 estimate would give it a density of 14+ g/cm3 and make Hestia more massive than several much larger asteroids.

References

External links 
 
 

000046
000046
Discoveries by N. R. Pogson
Named minor planets
000046
000046
18570816